HMS Essex was a 70-gun third rate built by Sir Henry Johnson of Blackwall in 1678/79. During the War of the English Succession she fought in the last major action. She was rebuilt in 1699/1700. During the War of Spanish Succession she fought at Vigo Bay, the Capture of Gibraltar and Velez Malaga. She also fought at the Battle off Passero in 1718. She was rebuilt again in 1736-40. She was in action off Toulon in 1744. She was active in the Channel and against French ports during the Seven Years War. She fought at Quiberon Bay in 1759. She was wrecked in Quiberon Bay in November 1759.

She was the second vessel to bear the name Essex since it was used for a 60-gun ship built at Deptford in 1653 and captured by the Dutch at the Battle of the Galloper Sand (the Four Days’ Battle) in June 1666.

HMS Essex was awarded the Battle Honours Barfleur 1692, Vigo 1702, Gibraltar 1704, and Velez-Malaga 1704, Passero 1718, and Quiberon Bay 1759.

Construction and Specifications
She was ordered on 20 February 1678 to be built under contract by Sir Henry Johnson of Blackwall on the River Thames. She was launched in 1679. Her builder's measure tonnage was calculated as 1,031 tons (burthen).

Her initial gun armament was in accordance with the 1677 Establishment with 72/60 guns consisting of twenty-six demi-cannons (54 cwt, 9.5 ft) on the lower deck, twenty-six 12-pounder guns (32 cwt, 9 ft) on the upper deck, ten sakers (16 cwt, 7 ft) on the quarterdeck and four sakers (16 cwt, 7 ft) on the foc’x’le with four 3-pounder guns (5 cwt, 5 ft) on the poop deck or roundhouse. By 1688 she would carry 70 guns as per the 1685 Establishment . Her initial manning establishment would be for a crew of 460/380/300 personnel.

Commissioned Service

Service 1679-1698
She was commissioned on 14 August 1679 under the command of Captain John Perryman for delivery to Chatham. In 1689 she was under the command of Captain Anthony Hastings followed in 1690 by Captain John Bridges. She fought in the Battle of Barfleur in Rear (Blue) Squadron, Rear Division from 19 to 22 May 1692. In 1693 she was under Captain William Wright. In 1697 she was under Captain Basil Beaumont followed by Captain Christopher Fogge. During this time, she sailed with the Dunkirk Squadron. She was to be rebuilt in Rotherhithe in 1699/1700.

Rebuild Rotherhithe 1698-1700
She was ordered on 23 September 1698 to be rebuilt under contract by John & Richard Wells of Rotherhithe. Her keel was laid in November 1698 and launched in May 1700. Her builder's measure tonnage was calculated as 1,088 tons (burthen). She probably retained her armament as stated in the 1685 Establishment, though it is unclear if her armament was changed to the 1703 Establishment later. It is known that when completed her gun armament total at least 70 guns.

Service 1702-1736
HMS Essex was commissioned in 1702 under the command of Captain John Hubbard for service with Sir George Rooke's Fleet. In August she was assigned to Rear-Admiral Sir Stafford Fairborne's Squadron. Admiral Fairborne's Squadron was detached to reconnoiter Corunna for French ships on the 22nd of July. Finding nothing they rejoined Sir George Rooke's Fleet at sea on 8 August. The Fleet arrived at the Bay of Bulls (north of Cadiz) on the 12th. After many meetings and much indecision, the Fleet departed on 18 September. On 21 September it was learned that a French Fleet and Spanish treasure ships were in the vicinity of Vigo Bay. On the 11th a council of war was held to determine the ships that would initially enter the bay. She fought in the Battle of Vigo as the Flagship of Rear-Admiral Fairborne on 12 October 1702Winfield 2009, Fleet Actions, 7.1 Battle of Vigo Bay. All French and Spanish ships were either taken or destroyed.

In 1703 she was assigned Captain Hubbard once more sailing with Admiral Sir Cloudisley Shovell. She was in the Capture of Gibraltar on 23 July 1704. She was in the attack on the town and south bastion. Gibraltar surrendered on the 24th. During the defense of Gibraltar, she participated in the Battle of Velez Malaga on 13 August 1704. She suffered 13 killed with 36 wounded during the battle. In 1706 she was under the command of Captain Henry Lumley operating with Sir John Leake's Fleet in the Mediterranean. In 1708 she was under the command of Captain John Smith. She spent the winter of 1708/09 in the Mediterranean. Captain Vincent Cutter had command in 1710 until his death in April. Captain Richard Leake took over command and served with the Main Fleet. In 1711 she was under Captain Kerryll Roffey for service in the English Channel.

She underwent a great repair at Chatham Dockyard costing £12,727 during October 1711 and January 1714. She was commissioned in 1715 under Captain Charles Strickland for service in the Baltic. In the Spring of 1718, she was fitted for service in the Mediterranean. When completed she was under the command of Captain Richard Rowzier then sailed to the Mediterranean. She fought in the Battle off Passero on 11 April 1718. During the battle she took the 36-gun Spanish ship Juno. Her next duty was as a guard ship at Sheerness under Captain Christopher O’Brien in 1721. She paid off at Chatham in 1723. She was dismantled at Woolwich completing in May 1736 with the intent for rebuilding.

Rebuild at Woolwich Dockyard 1736-1741
She was ordered on 20 May 1736 to be rebuilt at Woolwich Dockyard under the guidance of Master Shipwright John Hayward. Her keel was laid on 20 August 1736 and launched on 21 February 1741. Her builder's measure tonnage was calculated as 1,226 tons (burthen).

Her armament was in accordance with the 1733 Establishment and consisted of twenty-six 24-pounder guns on the lower deck (LD), twenty-six 12-pounder guns on the upper deck (UD), fourteen 6-pounder guns on the quarterdeck (QD), and four 6-pounder guns on the foc’x’le (Fc). During the late 1740s when she was reduced to a 64-gun ship she lost six 6-pounder guns (four from the QD and two from the Fc).

She was completed on 15 May 1741 at a cost of £25,765.7.3d.

Service 1741-1759
She was commissioned in February 1741 under the command of Captain Nathaniel Robson for service with Sir John Norris's Fleet. She sailed with Sir John Norris to the Mediterranean during 1742/43. In 1744 she was under Captain Richard Norris. She fought in the Battle of Toulon on 11 February 1744. From 1745 to 1747 she was under the command of Captain Richard Hughes serving in the Mediterranean. She was surveyed on 29 January 1749 and again on 21 June 1750. She underwent a middling repair at Woolwich Dockyard under Admiralty Order (AO) 19 April 1750 and AO 21 June 1750 for a cost of £13,386.14.10d between August 1750 and October 1751.

She was recommissioned in March 1755 under Captain Robert Harland for service with Admiral Sir Edward Hawke's Fleet. In April 1756, after the outbreak of the Seven Years War, she was sent to reinforce Admiral Hawke's Fleet. In the Summer of 1756, she was assigned to Sir Edward Boscawen's Fleet. She was the Flagship of Sir Charles Knowles in November 1756. She captured the privateers: La Sainte-Barbe on 30 December 1756, Le Puisieux on 3 August 1757, Le Comte de Herouville on 22 July 1757, and the 18-gun St Malo ship Le Comte de St Florentine on 3 August 1757. Later in 1757 Captain John (or James) Campbell took command. She served with Admiral Hawke's Fleet in October then she was with Cornish's Squadron in November/December. She attacked with HMS Pluto and HMS Proserpine a French convoy and took the 22-gun La Galatee plus the privateer Le Rostan and a transport on 7 April 1758. In mid-1758 Captain R. Darvil temporarily took command. She was the Flagship of Commodore the Honourable Richard Howe during operations against St Malo, France, Cherbourg, and St Cas between the months of June and September 1758. During the attack on St Malo in June Commodore Howe shifted his flag to the Success. For the operation at Cherbourg on 7/8 August, Commodore Howe shifted his Flag to the Pallas. By 1759 she was again under the command of Captain Campbell. In June she was temporarily under the command of Lieutenant George Johnstone. In July 1759 she was under the command of Captain Lucius O’Brien. She fought at the Battle of Quiberon Bay on 20 November 1759.

Loss
On 21 November 1759 following the battle, she was wrecked in Quiberon Bay. Essex had been attempting to chase the French Flagship Soleil Royal but both vessels went ashore and were wrecked.

Notes

Citations

References

 Colledge (2020), Ships of the Royal Navy, by J.J. Colledge, revised and updated by Lt Cdr Ben Warlow and Steve Bush, published by Seaforth Publishing, Barnsley, Great Britain, © 2020,  (EPUB), Section E (Essex)
 Winfield (2009), British Warships in the Age of Sail (1603 – 1714), by Rif Winfield, published by Seaforth Publishing, England © 2009, EPUB 
 Winfield (2007). British Warships in the Age of Sail (1714 - 1792). by Rif Winfield, published by Seaforth Publishing, England © 2007, EPUB 
 Lavery (2003) The Ship of the Line - Volume 1: The Development of the Battlefleet 1650-1850. by Brian Lavery, published by Conway Maritime Press, © 2003 
 Clowes (1898), The Royal Navy, A History from the Earliest Times to the Present (Vol. II). London. England: Sampson Low, Marston & Company, © 1898
 Clowes (1898), The Royal Navy, A History from the Earliest Times to the Present (Vol. III). London. England: Sampson Low, Marston & Company, © 1898
 Thomas (1998), Battles and Honours of the Royal Navy, by David A. Thomas, first published in Great Britain by Leo Cooper 1998, Copyright © David A. Thomas 1998,  (EPUB)

Ships of the line of the Royal Navy
1670s ships
Ships built by the Blackwall Yard
Ships built in Rotherhithe